Kougny is a department or commune of Nayala Province in western Burkina Faso. Its capital lies at the town of Kougny. According to the 1996 census the department has a total population of 15,383.

Towns and villages
Kougny	(3 633 inhabitants) (capital)
 Goin	(1 567 inhabitants)
 Gounian	(1 434 inhabitants)
 Gouri	(1 182 inhabitants)
 Kamba	(903 inhabitants)
 Kibiri	(499 inhabitants)
 Niaré	(1 904 inhabitants)
 Nimina	(1 746 inhabitants)
 Sebéré	(1 366 inhabitants)
 Tiouma	(1 149 inhabitants)

References

Departments of Burkina Faso
Nayala Province